Princess Changning (680- d. after 728), was a Chinese princess, the daughter of Emperor Zhongzong of Tang and Empress Wei (Tang dynasty). 

Married Yang Shenjiao of Hongnong, Duke Guan (弘農 楊慎交; 675–724), and had issue (two sons, one daughter)
Married Su Yanbo (蘇彥伯) in 728

References 

7th-century births
8th-century deaths
680 deaths
Tang dynasty princesses
8th-century Chinese women
8th-century Chinese people
Daughters of emperors